Spirembolus oreinoides is a species of sheet weaver found in the United States and Canada. It was described by Chamberlin in 1949.

References

Linyphiidae
Spiders of North America
Spiders described in 1949